A Strange Adventure is a 1932 American Pre-Code mystery film directed by Phil Whitman and starring Regis Toomey, June Clyde and Lucille La Verne. It is also known by the alternative title of The Wayne Murder Case.

Plot
When disagreeable millionaire Silas Wayne is murdered in his mansion with a large crowd of guests present who
"saw nothing", it is up to homicide detective Mitchell to discover which of Wayne's abused employees or greedy relatives might have committed the crime.

Main cast
 Regis Toomey as Detective-Sergeant Mitchell  
 June Clyde as 'Nosey' Toodles  
 Lucille La Verne as Miss Sheen  
 Jason Robards Sr. as Dr. Bailey  
 William V. Mong as Silas Wayne  
 Eddie Phillips as Claude Wayne  
 Dwight Frye as Robert Wayne 
 Nadine Dore as Gloria Dryden  
 Alan Roscoe as Stephen Boulter  
 Isabel Vecki as Sarah Boulter

References

Bibliography
 Gates, Phillipa. Detecting Women: Gender and the Hollywood Detective Film. SUNY Press, 2011.

External links
 

1932 films
1932 mystery films
American mystery films
American black-and-white films
Monogram Pictures films
Films directed by Phil Whitman
1930s English-language films
1930s American films